The Battle of Barawa was an armed military encounter between the Portuguese Empire and the Ajuran Sultanate, in the city of Barawa. The Portuguese staged a landing and achieved their objectives of sacking the city.

Battle

In February 1507, an armada of 16 ships commanded by Tristão da Cunha and assisted by Afonso de Albuquerque docked at Malindi, en route to India via the island of Socotra. The King of Malindi had been a faithful vassal of the Portuguese since the maiden voyage of Vasco da Gama to India in 1497, and at that instance, the King requested assistance from the Portuguese against the hostile cities of Oja, Lamu and Barawa. Oja was sacked and Lamu was subjugated without a fight.

Upon reaching Barawa, the Portuguese first offered the city the chance to submit without a fight, which was refused. The Portuguese made ready to assault the city, and reported that its defences included a wall and 4,000 men ready to fight.

The following morning, Tristão da Cunha and Afonso de Albuquerque led two assault groups ashore. 2,000 men sallied forth to fight the Portuguese on the beach, but were driven back to the city. Coming under attack from fire arrows, the Portuguese scaled the wall at a weak point and the defenses were breached. Many inhabitants fled, but those who remained perished in the fight. The city was then sacked and put to the torch, while the survivors watched from afar. Afterwards the Portuguese proceeded to Socotra Island.

After the attack, the city of Barawa was quickly rebuilt.

See also
 Capture of Ormuz (1507)
 Battle of Benadir
 Ajuran Empire
 History of Somalia

References

Sources
 

Ajuran Sultanate
Conflicts in 1506
Medieval Somalia
Battles involving Portugal
1507 in the Portuguese Empire